KrishnaKant Upadhyay (born 18 June 1986) is cricketer from Uttar Pradesh. Born in Agra, Uttar Pradesh, he plays for Pune Warriors India in the Indian Premier League and for Railways in Ranji Trophy. He is a medium pace bowler.

References 

1986 births
Living people
Pune Warriors India cricketers
People from Agra
Railways cricketers
Indian cricketers